The women's 10,000 metres walk event at the 2016 IAAF World U20 Championships was held at Poland's Zdzisław Krzyszkowiak Stadium on 19 July.

Medalists

Records

Results

References

10000 metres walk
Racewalking at the World Athletics U20 Championships